The 1977 Baltimore Colts season was the 25th season for the team in the National Football League (NFL). Led by third-year head coach Ted Marchibroda, the Colts finished with 10 wins and 4 losses, tied for first in the AFC East division with the Miami Dolphins. The Colts had the tiebreaker over Miami based on better conference record (9–3 to 8–4), and the Dolphins missed the playoffs.

This was the final playoff appearance for the Colts as a Baltimore-based franchise (their next came ten years later in 1987, by which time the team moved to Indianapolis). Baltimore's next playoff team was the Ravens in 2000, winners of Super Bowl XXXV.

Offseason 
Colts' owner Robert Irsay fired general manager Joe Thomas in January 1977, due to a power struggle he was having with head coach Ted Marchibroda. The new general manager was former Colts center Dick Szymanski, who was the personnel director and a former scout.

NFL draft

Personnel

Staff

Roster

Regular season

Schedule

Week 1 

    
    
    
    
    
    
    
    

 Lydell Mitchell 32 Rush, 114 Yds

Week 2 at Jets

Week 3

Week 4

Week 5

Week 6

Week 7

Week 8

Week 9

Week 10

Week 11

Week 12

Week 13

Week 14

Standings

Playoffs 

Baltimore made it to the AFC playoffs as a No. 2 seed and hosted the defending Super Bowl champion Oakland Raiders in the divisional round. The Colts held a 31–28 lead with time running out, when the famous “Ghost to the Post” play to tight end Dave Casper advanced the Raiders to the Baltimore 14-yard line, where Errol Mann kicked the tying field goal to send the contest into overtime. After the first overtime went scoreless, Casper caught a 10-yard touchdown pass 43 seconds into the period to win the game for the Raiders.

Divisional

References

See also 
 History of the Indianapolis Colts
 Indianapolis Colts seasons
 Colts–Patriots rivalry
 

Baltimore Colts
AFC East championship seasons
1977
Baltimore Colts